Natalia Vinyukova (born 27 March 1989) is a Russian handballer who plays for MKS Lublin.

References

1989 births
Living people
People from Maykop
Russian female handball players
Expatriate handball players
Russian expatriate sportspeople in Romania
Sportspeople from Adygea